Bazarny Syzgan is an urban locality (work settlement) and the administrative center of Bazarnosyzgansky District of Ulyanovsk Oblast, Russia. Population:

References

Notes

Sources

Urban-type settlements in Ulyanovsk Oblast
Karsunsky Uyezd